Boletice Military Training Area is a military training area in Český Krumlov District in the South Bohemian Region of the Czech Republic. It is located in the Bohemian Forest mountains.

References

External links

Military installations of the Czech Republic
Populated places in Český Krumlov District
Bohemian Forest